Ihor Nadein (3 March 1948 – 24 December 2014) was a Soviet football player and a Ukrainian coach and the Merited Coach of Ukraine.

References

External links
  Nadein became a manager of Metalurh Zaporizhzhia (Sovetsky Sport, October 29, 2002)
  Nadein became a manager of Helios Kharkiv (ua-football.com, July 3, 2007)
  Glory of the first blintzi (article at the website of Football Federation of Ukraine)
  Ihor Nadein and Zoporizhian football. History that will never be repeated. UA-Football

1948 births
2014 deaths
People from Tula, Russia
Ukrainian football managers
Soviet football managers
Ukrainian Premier League managers
FC Metalurh Zaporizhzhia managers
FC Kryvbas Kryvyi Rih managers
FC Torpedo Zaporizhzhia managers
FC Tiraspol managers
FC Dnipro players
FC Elektrometalurh-NZF Nikopol players
FC Zimbru Chișinău players
FC Arsenal Tula players
Soviet footballers
Russian emigrants to Ukraine

Association football midfielders
Moldovan Super Liga managers